The 2021–22 season was the 89th season in the existence of C.D. Tondela and the club's ninth consecutive season in the top flight of Portuguese football. In addition to the domestic league, C.D. Tondela participated in this season's editions of the Taça de Portugal and the Taça da Liga.

Players

First-team squad

Reserve team

Other players under contract

Out on loan

Transfers

Pre-season and friendlies

Competitions

Overall record

Primeira Liga

League table

Results summary

Results by round

Matches

Taça de Portugal

Taça da Liga

References

Tondela